The 2015 Campeonato Ecuatoriano de Fútbol de la Serie A (officially known as the Copa Pilsener Serie A for sponsorship reasons) was the 57th season of the Serie A, Ecuador's premier football league.

Emelec successfully defended their title for their third in a row and 13th overall.

Teams
Twelve teams are competing in the 2015 Serie A season, ten of whom remain from the previous season. Manta and Olmedo were relegated from the Serie A after accumulating the fewest points during the 2014 season. They were replaced by Aucas and River Plate, the 2014 Serie B winner and runner-up, respectively. Aucas is making their 35th top-flight appearance and their first return to the Serie A since 2006, while River Ecuador is participating in their first top-flight appearance.

Stadia and locations

Personnel and kits

First stage
The first stage began on January 31 and ended on July 12.

Second stage
The second stage began on July 17 and ended on December 13.

Finals

Aggregate table

Top goalscorers

External links

Official website 

Ecuadorian Serie A seasons
Campeonato Ecuatoriano de Fútbol Serie A
Serie A